Nanahughmilleria ("dwarf Hughmilleria") is a genus of eurypterid, an extinct group of aquatic arthropods. Fossils of Nanahughmilleria have been discovered in deposits of Devonian and Silurian age in the United States, Norway, Russia, England and Scotland, and have been referred to several different species.

Nanahughmilleria is classified in the family Adelophthalmidae, the only clade in the superfamily Adelophthalmoidea. This clade was characterised by their small size, their parabolic (approximately U-shaped) carapaces and the presence of epimera (lateral "extensions" of the segment) on the seventh segment, among others. Nanahughmilleria was different from its relatives by the presence of more spines in its appendages (limbs) and by its genital morphology. The largest species confidently assigned to the genus was N. norvegica at 10 cm (3.9 in), making it a comparatively small eurypterid.

Description

Like the other adelophthalmid eurypterids, Nanahughmilleria was a comparatively small eurypterid. The largest species confidently assigned to the genus, N. norvegica, only reached 10 cm (3.9 in), while the smallest one, N. clarkei, did not exceed 4 cm (1.6 in). Although N. lanceolata reached 16 cm (6.3 in), this species is probably not an adelophthalmid, but an eurypteroid. Other species such as N. notosibirica reached 9 cm (3.5 in) in length, while N. pygmaea had a total length of 8 cm (3.1 in).

Nanahughmilleria had long and narrow reniform (bean-shaped) eyes placed in an intramarginal (occurring within the margin) position. The streamlined form of its body indicates that Nanahughmilleria was an active swimmer adapted to swim crosscurrent. It had epimera (lateral "extensions" of the segment) present in the seventh segment, separating the preadomen (body segments 1 to 7) from the postabodmen (segments 8 to 12). The genital spatulae, a long, flat piece in the genital aperture, was very short. The walking legs (first to fifth appendages) of Nanahughmilleria were probably of Hughmilleria-type, that is, with a pair of spines in each podomere (leg segment). The paddle of the swimming leg was relatively wide. As in the other adelophthalmids, the telson was lanceolate and not very expanded.

Nanahughmilleria is only distinguished from the more derived members of Adelophthalmidae in the shorter and smaller spatulae and in the increased spinosity in the appendages.

History of research

First discoveries

The first species of what today is recognized as Nanahughmilleria was described in 1859 by John William Salter as "Eurypterus pygmaeus". Although Richard Banks first mentioned this species in 1856, this act is currently considered as nomen nudum ("naked name", a name coined without an adequate or completely missing description of it). The fossils mentioned by Banks consisted of two specimens, the first of which included carapace with the first five tergites (dorsal parts of the body segments) and the 8th and 9th segments of the swimming leg and the second including another nearly complete carapace. Both were collected in Kington, Herefordshire. N. pygmaea had an elongated carapace rounded along the anterior margin which narrows gradually anteriorly. A thin rim surrounded the carapace. The eyes were narrow, reniform and intramarginal. Its ocelli (light-sensitive simple eyes) were very small and located centrally. As in most eurypterid groups, the chelae (pincers) were small. It differs from other species in the more convergent form of the carapace and in the large size of the eyes, which were furthest from the margin. This species reached a length of 8 cm (3.1 in) in total. Erik N. Kjellesvig-Waering classified this species as part of the subgenus Hughmilleria (Nanahughmilleria) in 1961 along many other species.

In 1884, James Hall described another species of Eurypterus, E. prominens, based on a single carapace from the Clinton Group, a geological formation of the United States. This species differs from the others by the anterior position of its eyes placed in a submarginal (almost in the margin) point, unlike other species of Nanahughmilleria and Parahughmilleria. In addition, the carapace of this species was long and with ocelli placed forward. It has been suggested that this species could represent a separate genus. In fact, notes left by Kjellesvig-Waering in museum drawers indicate that he wanted to erect a new genus for N. prominens, Clintonipterus. As in N. pygmaea, this species was assigned to Nanahughmilleria in 1961.

In 1911, the Norwegian paleontologist and geologist Johan Aschehoug Kiær described a new species of Eurypterus, E. norvegica. The carapace of this species was parabolic (approximately U-shaped) with small intramarginal arcuate eyes. The metastoma (a large plate that is part of the abdomen) was oval. Its operculum (a plate-like segment which contains the genital aperture) had a long, narrow spatulae (compared to most eurypterids). The telson was lanceolate, with a keel on both dorsal and ventral sides. It had a pair of spines in each podomere of the fifth appendage. The paddle of the swimming leg was relatively wide. It was designated the type species of Nanahughmilleria by Kjellesvig-Waering in his description of the subgenus. N. norvegica was the largest species of Nanahughmilleria, measuring 10 cm (3.9 in, with the exception of N. lanceolata, which may represent a separate genus).

In 1957, L. P. Pirozhnikov described two new species of eurypterids, N. schiraensis and Parahughmilleria matarakensis, and erroneously assigned them to the stylonurine genus Rhenopterus. This species is only known by a poorly preserved carapace which was semi-oval and elongated, with a narrow margin surrounding it. The posterior margin was slightly concave. There is only one preserved eye, which was reniform, large and rose slightly from the surface of the carapace. At the closest point between both eyes, the ocelli were placed. The fossils were found at the Matarak Formation in Minusinsk, Siberia. Kjellesvig-Waering and Willard P. Leutze noticed that the species did not really represent a Rhenopterus and they assigned it in 1966 to its current genus. It has been suggested that this species is a synonym of P. matarakensis, but the Russian paleontologist Evgeniy S. Shpinev doesn't agree with this since the prosoma of N. schiraensis was longer and its eyes were closer to the margin than in P. matarakensis.

Creation of the subgenus and further discoveries

In 1961, Kjellesvig-Waering separated Hughmilleria into two subgenera according to the morphology of the eyes, H. (Hughmilleria) for species with large ovoid marginal eyes and H. (Nanahughmilleria) for species with small reniform intramarginal eyes. For the latter one, H. (N.) norvegica was designated as subgenotype. He assigned a total of seven species to the subgenus, of which only four (two of them tentatively) are still in Nanahughmilleria. The generic name is composed by the Latin word nana ("dwarf") and Hughmilleria.

N. clarkei is based on a series of fossils described and assigned to Hughmilleria shawangunk by John Mason Clarke and Rudolf Ruedemann in 1912. They believed that the carapaces with intramarginal eyes were modified by the compression. While this could happen in a single specimen, it is impossible to be in so many. Kjellesvig-Waering realized this and erected the species N. clarkei in 1964, named after Clarke, who described the original Shawangunk eurypterid fauna. This small species of only 4 cm (1.6 in) had a lanceolate carapace with intramarginal eyes located anteriorly. The telson was broad and lanceolate. This species is characterized by the presence of spurs in the genal angles (a "flat" part of the carapace edge).

It would not be until 2012 when another new species, N. notosibirica, was described by Shpinev. This species is known from two specimens, the holotype (PIN 1139/1) and paratype (PIN 1139/2). Its specific name, notosibirica, comes from the Greek word notos (southern) and Siberia, referring to the place where it was discovered. The carapace was parabolic and surrounded by a narrow marginal rim and with elongated eyes probably reniform. Only the fourth and fifth pair of prosomal appendages is known. These were of Hughmilleria-type and with rather small spines. The telson was small and wedge-shaped, known from fragmentary remains. The metasoma (the posterior "part" of the body) was notably narrower than the mesosoma (the "median part"). The total size of the species could be of 9 cm (3.5 in), being one of the largest species of Nanahughmilleria. This species differs from the others in the proportions of the body and position of the eyes.

In addition, the species N. lanceolata is tentatively classified as part of Nanahughmilleria. This species was originally described by Salter in 1856 as another species of his new genus Himantopterus. The swimming legs of this species were long and narrow, reaching the sixth segment of the body. The telson was lanceolate and with a keel in the middle. All known specimens of N. lanceolata lacks of eyes, making it difficult to determine their phylogenetic position. However, the prosomal and genital appendages were not typical of the Adelophthalmoidea, but probably of the Eurypteroidea.

Classification

Nanahughmilleria is classified as part of the family Adelophthalmidae, the only family within the superfamily Adelophthalmoidea. Nanahughmilleria was originally considered a subgenus of Hughmilleria, but Kjellesvig-Waering and Leutze considered it sufficiently different from Hughmilleria and elevated the subgenus to the genus level. It is the only polyphyletic genus (with grouped species that do not share an immediate common ancestor) of Adelophthlmidae, with the species N. prominens and N. lanceolata probably representing new and different forms.

In 2004, O. Erik Tetlie erected the family Nanahughmilleridae in a thesis to contain the adelophthalmoids with no or reduced genital spatulae and the second to fifth pair of prosomal appendages of Hughmilleria-type. This family contained Nanahughmileria, Pittsfordipterus and perhaps Parahughmilleria. However, the clade has almost never been used in subsequent studies and lists of eurypterids, and instead, they classify the nanahughmillerids as part of Adelophthalmidae. A basal clade between Bassipterus and Pittsfordipterus is better supported than the Nanahughmilleridae, while Nanahughmilleria is considered the sister taxon (closest relative) of the "derived clade" composed by Parahughmilleria and Adelophthalmus. These eurypterids shared a series of characteristics such as the almost identical carapace, paddle, eye shapes and eye position. However, its short telson, thin cuticular sculpture (ornamentation consisting of small, minute, scales across the back), very small spatulae and increased spinosity in the appendages suggest a more basal position. Before 2004, Nanahughmilleria was classified in the Hughmilleriidae family.

The cladogram below presents the inferred phylogenetic positions of most of the genera included in the three most derived superfamilies of the Eurypterina suborder of eurypterids (Adelophthalmoidea, Pterygotioidea and the waeringopteroids), as inferred by O. Erik Tetlie and Markus Poschmann in 2008, based on the results of a 2008 analysis specifically pertaining to the Adelophthalmoidea and a preceding 2004 analysis.

Paleoecology
Fossils of Nanahughmilleria have been found from the Silurian deposits of the Llandovery epoch to the Devonian deposits of the Eifelian epoch in North America, Europe and Siberia. It is believed that Nanahughmilleria, along with Parahughmilleria, Hughmilleria and the pterygotids, lived mainly in shallow lakes. In addition, the streamlined shape of the body of Nanahughmilleria suggests that it was an active swimmer capable of swimming against currents.

Nanahughmilleria can occur in an environment where eurypterids were abundant or scarce. The Silurian deposits of Ringerike, Norway, where fossils of N. norvegica have been discovered, include fossil remains of Mixopterus kiaeri, Stylonuroides dolichopteroides, Kiaeropterus ruedemanni and Erettopterus holmi, among other organisms like the malacostracan Dictyocaris slimoni or the chasmataspidid Kiaeria limuloides. On the other hand, Nanahughmilleria schiraensis and  Parahughmilleria matakarensis are the only animals of the Devonian deposits of Khakassia, Russia, together with land plants. In addition, the English species N. pygmaea from the Silurian has been associated with Salteropterus abbreviatus, Parahughmilleria salteri, Erettopterus spatulatus and Herefordopterus banksii, as well as some indeterminate species of cephalaspidomorphs and coelolepids. In the Silurian deposits of the Shawangunk Formation, Pennsylvania, N. clarkei occur together with Parahughmilleria maria, Ruedemannipterus stylonuroides, Hardieopterus myops and Hughmilleria shawangunk. Species of the gnathostomes Vernonaspis and Arthrophycus have also been found. Nanahughmilleria fossils have also been found in Scotland.

See also
 List of eurypterid genera
 Timeline of eurypterid research

References

Adelophthalmoidea
Silurian eurypterids
Devonian eurypterids
Eurypterids of North America
Eurypterids of Europe
Eurypterids of Asia
Fossil taxa described in 1961